Vexillum caloxestum is a species of small sea snail, marine gastropod mollusk in the family Costellariidae, the ribbed miters.

Description
The length of the shell attains 16 mm, its diameter 6 mm.

(Original description) The shell is obovate-fusiform. The pointed spire is turreted. The whorls are somewhat rounded above and sparingly plicate at the ribs. The interstices are pointed and striate. The colour of the shell is olive-green and lead. The body whorl is decorated with a narrow white band. The columella is four-plaited.  The aperture is very dark within.

Distribution
This marine species occurs off the Andaman Islands.

References

 Turner H. 2001. Katalog der Familie Costellariidae Macdonald, 1860. Conchbooks. 1–100 page(s): 22

External links
 

caloxestum
Gastropods described in 1888